Novaya Shilovshchina is a rural locality (a village) in Yenangskoye Rural Settlement, Kichmengsko-Gorodetsky District, Vologda Oblast, Russia. The population was 4 as of 2002.

Geography 
Novaya Shilovshchina is located 75 km southeast of Kichmengsky Gorodok (the district's administrative centre) by road. Staraya Shilovshchina is the nearest rural locality.

References 

Rural localities in Kichmengsko-Gorodetsky District